Chaviolas is an island in Lake Sils, located in the canton of Graubünden. Its surface is entirely wooded.

Politically the island belongs to the municipality of Sils im Engadin/Segl in the district of Maloja.

References

Swisstopo topographic maps

Bibliography
Barbara Heé (2009). Chaviolas: A Landscape, So Intimate and Aloof. Lars Müller Publishers, Baden

External links

Landforms of Graubünden
Lake islands of Switzerland